The United Coconut Planters Bank, more popularly known by its initials, UCPB, or by its old name, Cocobank, was a government-controlled and was one of the largest banks in the Philippines, ranking within the top twenty banks in the country in terms of assets.  It is the only existing universal bank not listed on the Philippine Stock Exchange. The bank, owing to its name, catered heavily to coconut farmers, but also served a wide-ranging clientele.

In July 2020, the Philippine government raised its stake with the bank to 97%, thus resulting for its conversion to a government controlled bank.

Effective March 1, 2022, UCPB merged with Land Bank of the Philippines, with Land Bank as the surviving entity.

History

UCPB started on May 15, 1963, as First United Bank (Philippines). With only four branches at the time, it was a small commercial bank.

UCPB's origin can be found in Presidential Decree No. 755 (or P.D. No. 755) by President Ferdinand Marcos on July 29, 1975, instructed the Philippine Coconut Authority (PCA) to "formulate and recommend for adoption credit policies affecting production, marketing and processing of coconut and other palm oils" and "to provide readily available credit facilities to the coconut farmers at preferential rates." The PCA, headed by Juan Ponce Enrile, then purchased the 72.2% of First United Bank owned by Jose Cojuangco.

Cocobank was the official short bank name in the 1980s and the early 1990s.

In 1990, UCPB, along with Equitable Banking Corporation (now Banco de Oro Universal Bank), Philippine National Bank and the Far East Bank and Trust Company (now the Bank of the Philippine Islands), formed MegaLink, one of the three main interbank networks in the Philippines. However, UCPB's ATM services date back to the 1980s, when it was one of the first financial institutions to offer ATM services. It established its pre-need services arm, Cocoplans, in 1993.

The bank is also heavily involved in social development projects and other charity works.  Today, UCPB is one of the largest Philippine banks, with 188 branches and 279 ATMs nationwide. It is also the only universal bank to have a rural banking subsidiary, although this has since been merged into its thrift banking operations since late 2005. In November, the last quarter of 2015, UCPB is now a member of BancNet.

In 2018, the bank started its conversion to a government bank, joining the league of LandBank, Development Bank of the Philippines and Overseas Filipino Bank. Later in 2020, the Philippine government dropped the privatization plans of the bank by further raising its stake of ownership from 75% to 97%, thus resulting furthermore for UCPB in becoming as a state-owned and controlled bank.

Merger with LandBank
On June 25, 2021, President Rodrigo Duterte signed an Executive Order No. 142 to merge Land Bank of the Philippines with the UCPB, with the former as the surviving entity.

Subsidiaries and affiliates

Subsidiaries of UCPB are the following:  
UCPB Leasing and Finance Corporation
UCPB Savings Bank
UCPB Securities, Inc.

Competition
Due to its position as a universal bank, UCPB competes primarily against major Philippine banks like Metrobank, Banco de Oro, EastWest Bank, BPI, Land Bank of the Philippines and PNB.

As a state controlled bank, it joins the league in competition with other government banks - Development Bank of the Philippines, Land Bank of the Philippines and Overseas Filipino Bank.

See also

List of banks in the Philippines
MegaLink
BancNet

References

External links
 Official UCPB−United Coconut Planters Bank website
 Businessmirror.com.ph: "UCPB expects 15% increase in net income next year"
  Philstar.com: "UCPB Income up 18% in Q1" (2013)
 Philstar.com: "UCPB Corporate Life Extended" (2012)
 Inquirer.net: "Gov’t set to bid out stake in UCPB"
 Inquirer.net: "Bank ordered to pay P1B to client over fraudulent loan" (2008) 
 Gmanews.tv: "Former GMA Network exec elected UCPB chair"

Banks of the Philippines
Companies based in Makati
Presidency of Ferdinand Marcos
Banks established in 1975
Philippine companies established in 1975
Banks disestablished in 2022
2022 disestablishments in the Philippines